Spokane County is a county located in the U.S. state of Washington. As of the 2020 census, its population was 539,339, making it the fourth-most populous county in Washington. The largest city and county seat is Spokane, the second largest city in the state after Seattle. The county is named after the Spokane tribe.

Spokane County is part of the Spokane-Spokane Valley metropolitan statistical area, which is also part of the greater Spokane-Coeur d'Alene combined statistical area that includes nearby Kootenai County, Idaho.

History

The first humans to arrive in what is now Spokane County arrived between 12,000 and 8,000 years ago and were hunter-gatherer societies who lived off the plentiful game in the area. Initially, the settlers hunted predominantly bison and antelope, but after the game migrated out of the region, the native people became dependent on gathering various roots, berries, and nuts, and harvesting fish. The Spokane tribe, after which the county is named, means "Children of the Sun" or "sun people" in Salishan Explorer-geographer David Thompson, working as head of the North West Company's Columbia Department, became the first European to explore what is now the Inland Northwest. After establishing the Kullyspell House and Saleesh House fur trading posts in what are now Idaho and Montana, Thompson then attempted to expand further west. He sent out two trappers, Jacques Raphael Finlay and Finan McDonald, to construct a fur-trading post on the Spokane River in Washington and trade with the local Indians. This post was established in 1810, at the confluence of the Little Spokane and Spokane Rivers, becoming the first enduring European settlement of significance in Washington. Known as the Spokane House, or simply "Spokane", it was in operation from 1810 to 1826.

Spokane County was established by the Washington legislature effective January 29, 1858. It was annexed by Stevens County on January 19, 1864, and recreated on October 30, 1879. The first post office in the county was located at Spokane Bridge. The current Spokane county seat holder, Spokane, wrested the seat from Cheney in 1886.

Geography
(Virtually no change in elevation occurs between the dam and the mouth of the Little Spokane River inside Riverside State Park.)

Spokane County has a complex geologic history and varied topography. To the west is the barren landscape of the Columbia Basin and to the east are the foothills of the Rockies—the Coeur d'Alene Mountains, which rise to the east in northern Idaho. Spokane County lies in a transition area between the eastern edge of the basaltic Channeled Scablands steppe plains to the west and the rugged, timbered Rocky Mountain foothills to the east. The area exhibits signs of the prehistoric geologic events that shaped the area and region such as the Missoula Floods, which ended 12,000 to 15,000 years ago. The geography to the southeast, such as the Saltese Flats and Saltese Uplands is characterized as a shrub–steppe landscape with grassy hills and ravines.

In ecology, as with the topography,  the county is also in a transition area, roughly split between the Columbia Plateau ecoregion in the southwest portion, where it is at the eastern edge of the basaltic Channeled Scablands steppe plain and the Northern Rockies ecoregion in the northwest portion, which is the rugged and forested Selkirk Mountains.

Rivers

 Spokane River
 Little Spokane River
 Latah Creek
 Deep Creek
 Cable Creek
 Saltese Creek

Lakes and reservoirs

 Medical Lake
 West Medical Lake
 Liberty Lake
 Newman Lake
 Shelley Lake

Notable summits and peaks
 Mount Spokane
 Mount Kit Carson
 Mica Peak
 Krell Hill

Notable parks
 Dishman Hills Natural Conservation Area
 Riverside State Park
 Riverfront Park
 Manito Park
 Mount Spokane State Park

National protected area
 Turnbull National Wildlife Refuge

Major highways

  Interstate 90
  U.S. Route 2
  U.S. Route 195
  U.S. Route 395
  State Route 27
  State Route 206
  State Route 290
  State Route 291
  State Route 902
  State Route 904

Adjacent counties

 Stevens County – northwest
 Pend Oreille County – north
 Bonner County, Idaho – northeast
 Kootenai County, Idaho – east
 Benewah County, Idaho – southeast
 Whitman County – south
 Lincoln County – west

Demographics

2000 census
As of the 2000 census,  417,939 people, 163,611 households, and 106,019 families were in the county. The racial makeup of the county was 88.62% White, 2.00% African American, 1.40% Native American, 1.88% Asian, 0.16% Pacific Islander, 0.82% from other races, and 2.76% from two or more races; 2.77% of the population were Hispanics or Latinos of any race. About 22.0% were of German, 10.7% Irish, 9.9% English, 7.6% American, and 6.4% Norwegian ancestry.

Of the 163,611 households, 32.4% had children under 18 living with them, 49.9% were married couples living together, 11.0% had a female householder with no husband present, and 35.2% were not families. About 28.1% of all households were made up of individuals, and 9.6% had someone living alone who was 65 or older. The average household size was 2.46, and the average family size was 3.02.

In the county, the age distribution was 25.7% under 18, 10.6% from 18 to 24, 28.9% from 25 to 44, 22.4% from 45 to 64, and 12.4% who were 65 or older. The median age was 35 years. For every 100 females. there were 96.40 males. For every 100 females age 18 and over, there were 93.60 males.

The median income for a household in the county was $37,308, and for a family was $46,463. Males had a median income of $35,097 versus $25,526 for females. The per capita income for the county was $19,233. About 8.30% of families and 12.30% of the population were below the poverty line, including 14.20% of those under age 18 and 8.10% of those age 65 or over.

2010 census
As of the 2010 census, 471,221 people, 187,167 households, and 118,212 families were residing in the county. The racial makeup of the county was 89.2% White, 2.1% Asian, 1.7% African American, 1.5% American Indian, 0.4% Pacific Islander, 1.2% from other races, and 3.8% from two or more races. Those of Hispanic or Latino origin made up 4.5% of the population. In terms of ancestry, 27.0% were German, 15.4% were Irish, 13.5% were English, 6.9% were Norwegian, and 4.4% were American.

Of the 187,167 households, 30.9% had children under 18 living with them, 47.2% were married couples living together, 11.2% had a female householder with no husband present, and 36.8% were not families; 28.6% of all households were made up of individuals. The average household size was 2.44, and the average family size was 2.99. The median age was 36.8 years.

The median income for a household in the county was $47,250 and for a family was $59,999. Males had a median income of $44,000 versus $33,878 for females. The per capita income for the county was $25,127. About 9.1% of families and 14.1% of the population were below the poverty line, including 17.0% of those under age 18 and 8.5% of those age 65 or over.

2020 census 
As of the 2020 census, 539,339 people, 209,640 households were residing within the county. The population density was 305.7/mi2 (118.0/km2) averaging 2.46 persons per household. The 227,877 housing units had an average density of 128/mi2 (49.4/km2).

Females consisted of 50.1% of the county. 5.6% of persons are less than 5 years of age, 21.8% are under 18 years, and 16.8% are 65 years or older.

The racial makeup of the county was 88.4% White, 6.6% Hispanic or Latino, 4.5% two or more races, 2.5% Asian, 2.1% Black or African American, 1.9% American Indian or Alaskan Native, 0.7% Native Hawaiian or other Pacific Islander. 5.3% of the county consist of foreign born persons.

Of those 25 years or older, 94.2% people in the county hold a high school diploma, GED, or higher; and 31.5% obtaining a bachelor's degree or higher. Of those below the age of 65 years, 10.% have a disability and 6.3% are without health insurance. The median household income was $64,079 (in 2021 dollars) and 11.2% of the county are living in poverty.

Law and government
Spokane County is governed by a partisan board of county commissioners, one from each of five districts. They run in a partisan primary election within their own district, then compete countywide in the general election. Other elected officials include the sheriff, auditor (who is also responsible for elections), assessor, treasurer, and prosecutor, which are also partisan offices. Spokane County has an appointed medical examiner. In 2023, Spokane County expanded the number of County Commissioner seats from 3 to 5. As of January 2023, the current commissioners for Spokane County are Chris Jordan (Democrat), Amber Waldref (Democrat), Josh Kerns (Republican), Mary Kuney (Republican), and Al French (Republican), from the first, second, third, fourth, and fifth county districts, respectively. The previous Sheriff was Ozzie D. Knezovich, who was appointed on April 11, 2006 and retired on December 31, 2022. The current Sheriff of Spokane County is John Nowles, who was appointed on January 1, 2023.

Transportation planning within the county is handled by the Spokane Regional Transportation Council, a metropolitan planning organization that was created in 1962. It distributes federal and state funds for transportation projects and updaties the long-range transportation plan for Spokane County.

The county has voted Republican all but three times since 1948. Lyndon Johnson was the last Democrat to win a majority of the county's vote. It gave a plurality of votes to Bill Clinton in both elections. Democratic strength is concentrated in Spokane itself and in Cheney, which is home to Eastern Washington University, while the suburban areas are heavily Republican.

Communities

Cities

 Airway Heights
 Cheney
 Deer Park
 Liberty Lake
 Medical Lake
 Millwood
 Spangle
 Spokane (county seat)
 Spokane Valley

Towns
 Fairfield
 Latah
 Rockford
 Waverly

Census-designated places

 Country Homes
 Fairchild Air Force Base
 Fairwood
 Four Lakes
 Mead
 Otis Orchards-East Farms
 Town and Country

Unincorporated communities

 Amber
 Buckeye
 Chattaroy
 Colbert
 Deep Creek
 Denison
 Duncan
 Dynamite
 Elk
 Espanola
 Freeman
 Garden Springs
 Geiger Heights
 Glenrose
 Greenacres
 Green Bluff
 Hazard
 Highland
 Manito
 Marshall
 Mica
 Milan
 Moab
 Mount Hope
 Newman Lake
 Nine Mile Falls
 Orchard Prairie
 Peone
 Plaza
 Riverside
 Seven Mile
 Silver Lake
 Spokane Bridge
 Spring Valley
 Stringtown
 Tyler
 Valleyford
 Veradale

Ghost towns/neighborhoods

 Babb
 Coey
 Darknell
 Dragoon
 Freedom
 Geib
 Hite
 Lyons
 Mock
 North Pine
 Rahm
 Rodna
 Saxby
 Scribner
 Wallner

Education
School districts include:

 Central Valley School District
 Cheney School District
 Deer Park School District
 East Valley School District (Spokane)
 Freeman School District
 Great Northern School District
 Liberty School District
 Mead School District
 Medical Lake School District
 Newport School District
 Nine Mile Falls School District
 Orchard Prairie School District
 Reardan-Edwall School District
 Riverside School District
 Rosalia School District
 Spokane Public Schools
 St. John School District
 Tekoa School District
 West Valley School District (Spokane)

See also
 National Register of Historic Places listings in Spokane County, Washington

References

External links

 

 
1858 establishments in Washington Territory
Populated places established in 1858
Eastern Washington
Washington placenames of Native American origin